Freddie Steele (December 18, 1912 – August 22, 1984) was a boxer and film actor born Frederick Earle Burgett in Seattle, Washington. He was recognized as the National Boxing Association (NBA) Middleweight Champion of the World between 1936 and 1938.  Steele was nicknamed "The Tacoma Assassin" and was trained by Jack Connor, Johnny Babnick; and Ray Arcel while in New York.  His managers included George McAllister, Dave Miller, Eddie Miller, and Pete Reilly.  He appeared as an actor in a number of Hollywood films in the 1940s, including Preston Sturges's Hail the Conquering Hero.

Early life
Steele was born on December 18, 1912 in Seattle, Washington to Virgie and Charles E. Steele.  As a youth, he played baseball, but in high school in Tacoma participated in basketball, soccer, football, golf, and swimming.

Professional career
A good boxer and a hard hitter, Steele lost only two fights during his first ten years in the ring. Among those he defeated were Ceferino Garcia, Ralph Chong, Leonard Bennett, Joe Glick, Bucky Lawless, Andy Divodi, "Baby" Joe Gans, Vince Dundee, Gorilla Jones, Swede Berglund, Young Stuhley, Meyer Grace, Henry Firpo, Eddie "Babe" Risko, Jackie Aldare, Gus Lesnevich, Paul Pirrone, Frank Battaglia, Ken Overlin, Carmen Barth, and Solly Krieger.

Taking the World Middleweight Boxing Championship
On July 11, 1936, he defeated Babe Risko to take the Middleweight Boxing Championship of the World in a unanimous fifteen round decision at the Civic Stadium in Seattle.   Steele floored Risko for seven seconds in the first round. Steele took seven of the fifteen rounds with good margins, with only four going to Risko.  Steele damaged both of Risko's eyes during the bout which hampered the reigning champion's ability to defend himself. The Associated Press gave Risko only three rounds of the well attended bout of around 27,000.

Defenses of the NBA World Middleweight Boxing Championship
On January 1, 1937, Steele defended his NBA World Middleweight Championship against William "Gorilla" Jones, a former champion, in a unanimous ten round decision in Wisconsin.  Steele had Jones down for a count of three in the seventh, and won all but one round in his decisive victory before a disappointing crowd of only 3,700.

On February 19, 1937 Risko attempted another shot at the title against Steele at Madison Square Garden but lost in a fifteen around unanimous decision.  The Associated Press gave Steele nine rounds, with five to Risko, and one even.  The bout, fought before a crowd of 11,600, was described as tedious by many reporters.

On May 11, 1937, Steele made his third defense of the NBA World Middleweight Title against Frank Battaglia in Seattle, Washington, winning in a third-round knockout.  Steele scored knockdowns in both the first and second rounds, before flooring Battaglia with a crushing left 34 seconds into the third round. 

He fought two memorable bouts with Fred Apostoli, winning the first, but suffering a TKO in a subsequent non-title match.

Losing the World Middleweight Boxing Championship
He lost the middleweight crown to Al Hostak in his next to last fight, in a first round knockout of a scheduled fifteen round contest at the Seattle Civic Arena on July 26, 1938.  After two light taps from Steele in the first round, Hostak floored his opponent briefly for the first time, and again shortly after for a count of five. Celebrity referee Jack Dempsey, the former heavyweight champion, stopped the fight after Steele arose after his third fall to the mat before a record Seattle crowd of 35,000.  After his third fall, Dempsey sent Steele to a neutral corner, and reached a count of seven before stopping the fight after Hostak tried to resume the fight.

After having been knocked down four times, being counted out at by Referee Dempsey, some ringside observers had accused Steele of coming out against Hostak with his hands down, thus getting KO'd in the first round. But Steele had been hampered by a cracked breastbone, which prevented him from lifting his gloves high to where they belonged--according to his chief sparring partner, Davey Ward.

Steele's career had declined after the death of his manager, Dave Miller in 1938 after surgery.  Steele lost his next and last fight to Jimmy Casino  in 1941. His final record included 125 wins (60 KOs), 5 losses, 11 draws and 1 No Contest.

Life after boxing

Freddie Steele was also known for his footwork, and waist-down shots of his footwork can be seen in the 1942 film Gentleman Jim in which he performed as boxing double for star Errol Flynn.

Steele went on to appear in a number of Hollywood films as an actor throughout the 1940s, notably as "Bugsy", one of the six Marines central to the plot of the Oscar-nominated Hail the Conquering Hero (1944), directed by Preston Sturges.  He also appeared as Sergeant Steve Warnicki in The Story of G.I. Joe, 1945, and in Whiplash and I Walk Alone, both in 1948.  He appeared in nearly 30 films, though went uncredited in most.

He left Hollywood in the 1950s, and returned to the Pacific Northwest. He owned and operated Freddie Steele's restaurant in Westport, Washington with his wife, Helen, for over 20 years until illness forced his retirement.

Death
Steele died at a nursing home in Aberdeen, Washington on August 22, 1984; he had suffered a stroke in 1980. He is interred in the Fern Hill Cemetery, Aberdeen, WA.

Professional boxing record

Primary boxing achievements

|-

|-

|-

Honors
Freddie Steele is an honored member of both the International Boxing Hall of Fame (1999) and the World Boxing Hall of Fame. He was one of the three original inductees into the Tacoma-Pierce County Sports Hall of Fame when it opened in 1957.

References

External links
 
The Career of Freddie Steele Revisited, by Dan Cuoco, (IBRO)
CBZ's version of Steele's Fight Record
Steele's Death Certificate

 Guide to the Nate Druxman Seattle Boxing Photograph and Ephemera Collection

1912 births
1984 deaths
American male boxers
Middleweight boxers
American male film actors
Boxers from Washington (state)
Sportspeople from Tacoma, Washington
World middleweight boxing champions
International Boxing Hall of Fame inductees
20th-century American male actors
Male actors from Tacoma, Washington